Frank Minis Johnson Jr. (October 30, 1918 – July 23, 1999) was a United States district judge and United States Circuit Judge serving 1955 to 1999 on the United States District Court for the Middle District of Alabama, United States Court of Appeals for the Fifth Circuit and United States Court of Appeals for the Eleventh Circuit. He made landmark civil rights rulings that helped end segregation and disenfranchisement of African Americans in the South. In the words of journalist and historian Bill Moyers, Judge Johnson "altered forever the face of the South."

Early life, education and career

Johnson was born in 1918 and grew up in Haleyville in northern Alabama, a longtime independent-minded part of the state. Winston County had opposed secession from the Union during the American Civil War. While a student, he was asked by a staunchly Democratic classmate why he insisted upon being a Republican, to which Johnson replied that there were "so few of us that one day I might be a federal judge." Another classmate George C. Wallace, future governor of the state, overheard the remark and replied, "Well, that'll be the day. I'll be governor by then." Wallace would prove to be Johnson's bête noire during the civil rights era of the 1960s.

Johnson graduated from the University of Alabama and later the University of Alabama School of Law with a Bachelor of Laws in 1943, and was admitted to the bar.

He married Ruth Jenkins, a classmate from the University of Alabama.  Johnson served in the United States Army in Europe during World War II, while his wife Ruth served in the WAVES as an adviser to Hollywood directors making films about the war.

After military service, Johnson entered private law practice in Jasper, Alabama from 1946 to 1953. Unlike most white voters of the time in Alabama, he became active in politics with the Republican Party, serving as a delegate to the 1948 Republican National Convention. He managed Alabama's "Veterans for Eisenhower" group during the 1952 campaign. Johnson was known as a foe of the Democratic Party's segregationist policies. He was appointed as the United States Attorney for the Northern District of Alabama from 1953 to 1955, during President Dwight D. Eisenhower's administration.

Federal trial judicial service

Johnson received a recess appointment from President Dwight D. Eisenhower on October 22, 1955, to a seat on the United States District Court for the Middle District of Alabama vacated by Judge Charles Kennamer. He was nominated to the same position on January 12, 1956. He was confirmed by the United States Senate on January 31, 1956, and received his commission on February 1, 1956. He served as Chief Judge from 1966 to 1979. His service terminated on July 12, 1979, due to his elevation to the Fifth Circuit.

Notable district court case and incidents

In 1956, Johnson ruled in favor of Rosa Parks, striking down the "blacks in the back of the bus" law of the city of Montgomery Alabama, as unconstitutional. In orders issued in 1961 and 1962, he ordered the desegregation of bus depots (such as the Montgomery Greyhound station) and the Montgomery Regional Airport in Alabama's Middle judicial district. In 1961 he ordered the Ku Klux Klan and Montgomery police to stop the beating and harassment of Freedom Riders attempting to integrate interstate bus travel.

In March 1965, Judge Johnson ruled that activists had the right to undertake the Selma to Montgomery march as a means to petition the government, overturning Governor George Wallace's prohibition of the march as contrary to public safety. Thousands of sympathizers traveled to Selma to join the march, which had 25,000 participants by its last leg into Montgomery on March 25, 1965. It was considered integral to gaining passage by Congress of the Voting Rights Act of 1965.

Judge Johnson received death threats and ostracism for his role in advancing civil rights, and was protected by federal marshals for nearly two decades.  A burning cross was placed on his lawn in 1956 following the Rosa Parks decision, and his mother's house was bombed in 1967, although she was not hurt.

FBI director nomination

In 1977 President Carter and Attorney General Griffin Bell asked Johnson to become FBI Director when Director Clarence M. Kelley stepped down. But, the day after Carter nominated him, Johnson was found to have an aneurysm, or abnormal swelling, of his abdominal aorta. His nomination had to be withdrawn and William H. Webster was nominated in his place.

Federal appellate judicial service

Johnson was nominated by President Jimmy Carter on April 2, 1979, to the United States Court of Appeals for the Fifth Circuit, to a new seat established by 92 Stat. 1629. He was confirmed by the Senate on June 19, 1979, and received his commission on June 21, 1979. His service terminated on October 1, 1981, due to reassignment to the Eleventh Circuit.

Johnson was reassigned to the newly established United States Court of Appeals for the Eleventh Circuit by operation of law on October 1, 1981. He assumed senior status on October 30, 1991. He was succeeded on the bench by Judge Edward Earl Carnes. His service terminated on July 23, 1999, upon his death.

Johnson additionally served on the Temporary Emergency Court of Appeals from 1972 to 1982.

Johnson served more than 40 years on the federal bench. At the memorial service after his death, he was praised by former United States Senator Howell Heflin, Democrat of Alabama, who said that the judge's "unrelenting devotion to the rule of law" helped him strike down segregation laws.

Death

Johnson died at his home in Montgomery of pneumonia after being briefly hospitalized for a fall at his home the week prior.

Legacy and honors
1978, Golden Plate Award of the American Academy of Achievement presented by Awards Council member Judge John Sirica
1979, inducted into the Alabama Academy of Honor 
1992, Frank M. Johnson Jr. Federal Building and United States Courthouse, where Johnson served in Montgomery, Alabama, was named for him
1993, American Bar Association's annual Thurgood Marshall Award 
1995, Presidential Medal of Freedom.

Notable decisions

Browder v. Gayle (1956)
Orders the racial integration of the public transportation system of the city of Montgomery, Alabama.
Gomillion v. Lightfoot (1961)
Invalidated a plan by the city of Tuskegee, Alabama to dilute potential black voting strength by redrawing city boundaries so as to exclude concentrations of black voters from the city.
United States v. Alabama (1961)
Ordered that black persons be registered to vote if their application papers were equal to the performance of the least qualified white applicant accepted on the voting rolls.
Lewis v. Greyhound (1961), 
Required desegregation of the bus depots of the city of Montgomery, as these served interstate buses operating under federal law.
United States v. City of Montgomery (1961)
Ordered the city of Montgomery to surrender its voting registration records to the US Department of Justice; DOJ was studying why so few African Americans were registered to vote in a state with numerous majority-black counties.
United States v. City of Montgomery, 201 F. Supp. 590 - Dist. Court, MD Alabama 1962
Required desegregation of airport and related facilities at Dannelly Field in the city of Montgomery
Sims v. Frink (1962)
Required the state of Alabama to reapportion state legislative districts to adhere to the 'one man, one vote' principle as stipulated in its 1901 constitution. The state districts had not been reapportioned since that date, although such reapportionment was supposed to take place following every decennial census. This had resulted in marked under-representation of urban citizens, as demographic changes had created density of population in urbanized cities and areas
Lee v. Macon County Board of Ed. (1963)
Mandated, in Alabama, the first statewide desegregation of public schools.
Williams v. Wallace (1965)
Ordered Gov. George Wallace in March 1965 to permit the Selma to Montgomery march to take place, which was organized by the Southern Christian Leadership Conference (SCLC), DCVL and SNCC.
White v. Crook (1966)
Ruled that the state of Alabama must permit both male and female Blacks to serve on juries; they were qualified after regaining the ability to register and vote. The case was brought as a class action suit on behalf of black residents on Lowndes County, Alabama; other class members joined so that the decision applied to the state. It was "one of the first civil actions brought to remedy systematic exclusion of Negroes from jury service generally."
United States v. Alabama (1966)
Declared the Alabama poll tax unconstitutional.
Weeks v. Southern Bell (1969)
Ruled that women had a statutory right to choose, for themselves, whether to work in physically demanding jobs that were historically performed by men.
Smith v. YMCA of Montgomery (1970)
Ordered the desegregation of the Montgomery chapter of the YMCA.
Wyatt v. Stickney (1971)
Established a right to treatment for people with mental illness who have been involuntarily committed. 
NAACP v. Dothard (1974)
Required the state of Alabama to continue hiring (as ordered by the court in 1972) to overcome decades of racial discrimination in the Dept. of Public Safety, wherein the department should hire 50% blacks in state trooper and support positions until racial parity of 25% representation was achieved.
Garcia-Mir v. Meese (1986)
Upheld that existing U.S. law superseded customary international law.

In popular culture
Johnson is played by Martin Sheen in the 2014 film Selma.

References

Sources

External links

 "Frank M. Johnson", Alabama Academy of Honor, 1979 
 "Frank M. Johnson", 1993 Thurgood Marshall Award, American Bar Association, Awards
 

1918 births
1999 deaths
20th-century American judges
20th-century American lawyers
Alabama Republicans
United States Army personnel of World War II
Civil rights movement
Judges of the United States Court of Appeals for the Eleventh Circuit
Judges of the United States Court of Appeals for the Fifth Circuit
Judges of the United States District Court for the Middle District of Alabama
Military personnel from Alabama
People from Haleyville, Alabama
Presidential Medal of Freedom recipients
Selma to Montgomery marches
United States Attorneys for the Northern District of Alabama
United States court of appeals judges appointed by Jimmy Carter
United States district court judges appointed by Dwight D. Eisenhower
University of Alabama School of Law alumni